Bénédicte may refer to:
Bénédicte Augst (born 1968), French rhythmic gymnast
Bénédicte Couvreur, French film producer
Bénédicte Cronier (born 1961), French bridge player
Bénédicte Dorfman-Luzuy (born 1971), French rower
Bénédicte Duprez (born 1951), French swimmer
Bénédicte Kurzen (born 1980), French photographer and photojournalist
Bénédicte Liénard (born 1965), Belgian filmmaker
Bénédicte Paviot, French television news reporter
Bénédicte Pesle (1927–2018), French arts patron
Bénédicte Pételle (born 1971), French politician
Bénédicte Peyrol (born 1991), French Allier politician
Bénédicte de Raphélis Soissan, French entrepreneur
Bénédicte Taurine (born 1971), French La France Insoumise politician

Benedicte may also refer to:
 a Christian prayer said on Sundays, see Canonical hours

Other versions of the name
Benedictus (disambiguation)
Benoit
Benedict

French feminine given names